Discrimination in education is the act of discriminating against people belonging to certain categories in enjoying full right to education. It is considered a violation of human rights. Education discrimination can be on the basis of ethnicity, nationality, age, gender, race, economic condition, disability and religion.

The Convention against Discrimination in Education adopted by UNESCO on 14 December 1960 aims to combat discrimination and racial segregation in education. As of December 2020, 106 states were members of the convention.

Education discrimination in different countries

Australia

Australia has had a history of racial discrimination against Indigenous Australians in many areas, including education. In 1966, Australia signed the Convention against Discrimination in Education. Each state now has comprehensive anti-discrimination laws that prohibit such discrimination. In 1992, Australia enacted the Disability Discrimination Act 1992 (Cwth) to outlaw discrimination against students with disabilities.

China
Although all people are entitled to nine years of compulsory education in China, there are reports showing that minorities including people with disabilities are discriminated against in basic education. An example of such discrimination that is reflected in the 2013 Human Rights Watch report is of children with attention-deficit/hyperactivity disorder (ADHD) and intellectual disability who were denied enrollment in nearby schools due to their disabilities. Their parents then had to travel long distances from home to find a place for their disabled children for basic education.

There are also policies for geographical allocation of available sits in higher education system which led to regional discrimination in the Higher Education Entrance Examination. In China every person has a place of origin in connection to his/her birthplace, and moving or resettlement to provinces/zones other than the ones of origin are subject to receive permits from the authorities. The students subject to regional discrimination are those who managed to have a better record in the relevant exams but are denied studying at top universities due to their place of origin.

Cuba
Cuba has a diverse and multicultural society and there is potentially an available arena for various forms of racial discrimination to grow. Some believe the Cuban educational system suffers from racial discrimination, especially against Afro-Cubans, but the existence of counterparts who believe otherwise can not be neglected.

In the 1960s and 1970s, when the sexual minority groups were sentenced to stay in rehabilitation camps, they automatically lost the opportunity for higher education and were bound to "re-education" by the state. In 2010, Fidel Castro acknowledged such discrimination during his rule, regretting that he did not pay enough attention to the "great injustice" suffered.

Islamic Republic of Iran
After the Islamic revolution, the new government focused on the Islamization of the country's educational system. Ruhollah Khomeini was in strong favor of single-sex schools and expressed it in his speech at the anniversary of the birth of Fatimah bint Muhammad, which soon became policy in the country. The political figure stated:The current constitution of Iran states in Article 4 that: "All civil, penal, financial, economic, administrative, cultural, military, political, and other laws and regulations must be based on Islamic criteria. This principle applies absolutely and generally to all articles of the Constitution as well as to all other laws and regulations" The cultural and religious embodiments of Androcentrism can be seen throughout the countries infrastructure and policies. For instance, Iran still considers household and childcare as women's primary responsibility," as shown through the difference in school criteria between the two sexes. In addition, Bahá'í students have been systematically expelled from Iranian universities on grounds of religion.

United States
The United States is not a signatory to the Convention against Discrimination in Education. The United States has always had institutional discrimination, with very high discrimination rates. Discrimination in education is not only performed by one individual but by big organizations as well. Discrimination can also take place by a teacher which might have higher standards for one students than the other. Segregating schools is a way in which low income students may be isolated from higher income students, which causes them to have a much less efficient education. In 2004 many schools had a very disproportionate number of minority students specific schools, in a Seattle neighborhood where the population was 95% Caucasian the schools population was 99% black and Hispanic. (Kozol, 22) In San Diego CA, Rosa Parks school has 86% black and Hispanic students and only 2% white, and in Los Angeles CA there is a school that bears the name of Dr. King and it has  99% black and Hispanic students. (Kozol, 24)

In the 1970s when the number of students attending New York's schools were still substantially non-equal white, the number of doctors was around 400. As the number of white students started to decline so did the number of doctors available to attend to the needs of students. By 1993 the number of doctors had been cut to 23 and most of them were part-time doctors, children in the Bronx where all these doctors had been removed from were 20 more times more likely than those children living in the city to develop asthma. Another example of discrimination that occurs still today is also seen based on how each student is categorized with a price tag on them a soon as they started attending school: The students living in a low income community with low income families are valued at a lower priced then students that attend rich a schools and live in a higher class community. What this labeling means is that if you are born in a low income community you might receive for example $8,000 a year but if you are born in a rich community and attend a school at a rich community you might be receiving $16,000 a year for school education. "In 1998, New York's Board of Education spent about $8,000 yearly on the education of a third grade child in a New York City public school". (Kozol, 45)  If you were to lift that same child and put them in a typical white suburb of New York he/she would be worth about $12,000, if you were to pick that child up once again and put him/her in one of the wealthiest white suburbs of New York their price tag goes up to $18,000. (Kozol, 45)   This labeling of students and how much they will be receiving towards school education is an example of discriminations and the way in which the poor stay poor and the rich keep getting chances to get richer. Teachers at schools also get discriminated against, the wages they get paid in a low income school is far less than those working in wealthy neighborhoods, the conditions in which schools are maintained is also discriminatory because students can't learn the materials and score high on tests if they don't have the proper teachers, proper materials, proper nutrition and adequate class rooms. All of these examples mentioned beforehand are explained with much more detailed information in the book The Shame of the Nation by Jonathan Kozol.

There is discrimination in education among schools that are in areas of lower income (generally students of color). This level of discrimination amongst marginalized groups can increase the "learning gap." This in turn already forces these specific people behind in their future endeavors. In The Shame of the Nation'' the author provides us with examples of students who come from lower income residences attend school with required work related workshops, instead of AP classes. Kozol provides an example of a student named Mireya, a black student, who wanted to be a doctor or a social worker, but was required to take a sewing class as well "Life Skill" class (Kozol, 178). In addition Mireya had plans to attend college, Kozol asked the teacher why she was not able to skip these subject and take classes that would help her pursue her college goals, Kozol was faced with the teachers response "It isn't a question of what students want. It's what the school may have available (Kozol, 179). Mireya was face with a confrontation of another student that made a claim "You're ghetto-so you sew!" (Kozol, 180). From this example students of color who are also low income, attend school that appear to be programmed to get them to the workforce (job), as opposed to other privileged schools who are able to provide their students with AP classes, getting them ready for college.

Teacher bias in grading
In several countries, teachers were shown to systematically give students different grades for an identical work, based on categories like ethnicity or gender.
According to the Education Longitudinal Study, "teacher expectations [are] more predictive of college success than most major factors, including student motivation and student effort".
Grading bias can be detected by comparing the outcome of exams where the teacher knows the student's characteristics with blind exams where the student is anonymous. This method may underestimate the bias since, for written exams, the handwriting style might still convey information about the student.
Other studies apply the same method to cohorts spanning multiple years, to measure each teacher's individual biases.
Alternatively, teacher's grading bias can be measured experimentally, by giving teachers a fabricated assignment were only the name (and thus gender and ethnicity) of the student differs.

Sexism 
Multiple studies in various disciplines and countries found that teachers systematically give higher grades to girls and women.
This bias is present at every level of education, in elementary school (United States), middle school (France, Norway, United Kingdom, United States) and high school (Czech Republic).
Grading discrimination is also present in university admission exams: in the United States, the counselors who evaluate students for college admission favor women over men.
In France, it was shown that in the admission exam for elite school École Normale Supérieure, juries were biased against men in male-dominated disciplines (such as mathematics, physics or  philosophy) and biased against women in female-dominated ones (such as biology or literature).
Similar results were obtained for teacher's accreditation exams at the end of university. Female teachers tend to have a stronger pro-female bias than male teachers.

Using individual teacher effects, Massachusetts Institute of Technology's Camille Terrier showed that teachers' bias affects male students' motivation and impairs their future progress.
It can also significantly affect the students' career decisions.
There is some evidence that students are aware of the unfair grading. For example, middle school boys tend to expect lower grades from female teachers.

Racism 
According to a study from Germany, students from the Turkish ethnic minority are given lower grades than native Germans.

See also
 Bias in education
 Convention against Discrimination in Education - a UNESCO initiative
 Freedom of education
 Inclusion (education)
 Psychological impact of discrimination on health
 Right to education
 Racial segregation
 Sex differences in education - sex-based discrimination in education and its effects
 Malala Yousafzai

References

Discrimination
Education issues